Robert Gray (14 December 1923 – 8 April 2022) was an English footballer who played as a goalkeeper. Gray started his career with Whitehall Juniors and Newcastle United before joining Gateshead in 1944. He made 432 league appearances and 28 appearances in the FA Cup for Gateshead (as well as 57 appearances in the wartime league) before spells at non-league Ashington and North Shields. Gray died on 8 April 2022, at the age of 98.

References

Sources

1923 births
2022 deaths
English footballers
Association football goalkeepers
Newcastle United F.C. players
Gateshead A.F.C. players
Ashington A.F.C. players
North Shields F.C. players
English Football League players
Footballers from Newcastle upon Tyne